The Torquay by-election of 15 December 1955 was held after the death of Conservative Member of Parliament (MP) Charles Williams:

Electoral history
The seat was safe, having been won by Williams at the 1955 general election with a majority of over 17,000 votes The seat had been Conservative since Williams gained the seat from the Liberals in 1924. At the 1955 general election, the Labour Party had come second, as it had done at every election since 1945.

Candidates
Frederic Bennett was the Conservative candidate selected to hold the seat. He was the former MP for Reading North, who had lost his seat at the 1955 general election. His father had been an MP for both the Liberal and Labour parties.
William Hamling was the new Labour candidate. He defeated Thomas Ponsonby (grandson of the Lord Ponsonby who lead the Labour Party in the House of Lords in the early 1930s) and C. B. Attlee (nephew of the former Labour leader and Prime Minister, Clement Attlee).
Peter Bessell had been selected at the last minute to be the Liberal candidate at the 1955 general election and was re-selected for the by-election.

Result

References

1955 elections in the United Kingdom
1955 in England
1950s in Devon
December 1955 events in the United Kingdom
By-election, 1955
By-elections to the Parliament of the United Kingdom in Devon constituencies